Wilson Cruz (born Wilson Echevarría; December 27, 1973) is an American actor known for playing Rickie Vasquez on My So-Called Life, Angel in the Broadway tour production of Rent, Dr. Hugh Culber on Star Trek: Discovery, and the recurring character Junito on Noah's Arc. As a gay man of Afro-Puerto Rican ancestry, he has served as an advocate for gay youth, especially gay minorities.

Early life
Cruz was born in Brooklyn, New York, to parents born in Puerto Rico. His family eventually moved to Rialto, California, where he attended Eisenhower High School, graduating in 1991. At age 19, Cruz came out to his parents as gay, first to his mother and then his father. While his mother was initially hurt and shocked, she eventually accepted the news. His father, however, threw him out of the house, and Cruz spent the next few months living in his car and at the homes of friends. He later reconciled with his father.

Career
Cruz went to Hollywood to seek work as an actor, intending to be open about his sexuality from the beginning of his career. In 1994 he was cast as Enrique "Rickie" Vasquez, a troubled, gay teen, in the short-lived, critically acclaimed cult classic TV series My So-Called Life. This made Cruz the first openly gay actor to play an openly gay character in a leading role in an American television series.

Following My So-Called Life'''s cancellation, Cruz went on to play J. Edgar Hoover's servant Joaquin in Oliver Stone's film Nixon and had a small role in the television movie On Seventh Avenue. In 1996, he appeared with David Arquette as Mikey in Johns, about the day-to-day struggles of male prostitutes. In 2000, he played Victor in the final season of Party of Five. He also had a recurring role as Rafael de la Cruz on the series, Raising the Bar.

Cruz's other acting credits include the films Joyride (1996), All Over Me (1997), Supernova (2000), Party Monster (2003), Margaret Cho's Bam Bam and Celeste (2005), Coffee Date (2007), and He's Just Not That Into You (2009); the television film The Perfect Pitch (2002); and guest appearances on the series Great Scott!, Sister, Sister, ER, Ally McBeal, The West Wing, Noah's Arc, and Grey's Anatomy. Cruz starred as Adrian in the film The Ode (2007), based on the novel Ode to Lata by Ghalib Shiraz Dhalla.

He also appeared/starred in the 2009 movie The People I've Slept With. He plays the openly gay best friend of a promiscuous woman who tries to find out who got her pregnant so that she can get married.

Since 2020, Cruz has been a recurring guest on 25 Words or Less.

Personal life

Cruz works with and advocates on behalf of LGBT youth, especially youth of color. He has volunteered his time as host for the Youth Zone, an online community at Gay.com for LGBT youth. He was the Grand Marshal of the 1998 West Hollywood Gay Pride parade, the 2005 Chicago Pride Parade and the 2019 Fierté Montréal Pride Parade in Québec. In 2008, he was the keynote speaker at the University of Illinois at Chicago's Lavender Graduation and Rainbow Banquet honoring graduating LGBT students.

Cruz joined the board of directors of GLAAD in 1997 in order to assist the organization through a leadership transition, and joined the staff of GLAAD in 2012 as a National Spokesperson and Strategic Giving Officer.

Cruz's maternal stepaunt Brenda Lee Marquez McCool was among the 49 victims killed in the 2016 Orlando nightclub shooting; Cruz stated that she was killed while protecting her son Isaiah, who survived, from the gunfire.

In 2020, Wilson was honored on one of the covers of Out'' magazine's annual Out100 issue, saying Wilson "beautifully weaves his activism inside every aspect of his work".

Filmography and stage

Television

Film

Stage

See also

 List of Puerto Ricans

References

External links

 
 

1973 births
Living people
Male actors from New York City
American male film actors
American people of Puerto Rican descent
American male stage actors
American male television actors
American gay actors
LGBT people from New York (state)
American LGBT rights activists
People from Brooklyn
People from Rialto, California
20th-century American male actors
21st-century American male actors
Activists from California
Activists from New York (state)
LGBT Hispanic and Latino American people
People of Afro–Puerto Rican descent
20th-century African-American people
21st-century African-American people